Darío Andrés Siviski (born 20 December 1962 in Avellaneda) is a former Argentine football midfielder who played for a number of clubs in Argentina, Mexico, Switzerland and Japan. He represented Argentina at the 1988 Olympic games and played for the full Argentina national team at Copa América 1987.
Siviski started his playing career in 1981 with Temperley he spent some time in Mexico with Toluca before returning to Temperley in 1985.
In 1986 Siviski joined San Lorenzo de Almagro where he played 126 games, scoring 21 goals. In 1990, he joined Servette of Switzerland. He has also played for Independiente and Estudiantes de La Plata in the Argentine Primera and  Avispa Fukuoka in the J-League under manager Hugo Maradona.

Towards the end of his playing career he played for Grupo Universitario de Tandil before returning to his first club Club Atlético Temperley in 1997.

He represented Argentina at the 1988 Olympic games and played for the senior Argentina national team on six occasions including games at Copa América 1987.

After retiring as a footballer he has worked in various roles including football agent, coach and sporting director.

External links

Darío Siviski CV
San Lorenzo micro profile 
Darío Siviski at BDFA.com.ar 

1962 births
Living people
Sportspeople from Avellaneda
Argentine footballers
Argentina international footballers
1987 Copa América players
Footballers at the 1988 Summer Olympics
Association football midfielders
San Lorenzo de Almagro footballers
Club Atlético Independiente footballers
Estudiantes de La Plata footballers
Deportivo Toluca F.C. players
Servette FC players
Expatriate footballers in Mexico
Expatriate footballers in Japan
Expatriate footballers in Switzerland
Avispa Fukuoka players
Argentine Primera División players
Swiss Super League players
Liga MX players
Argentine expatriate footballers
Jewish Argentine sportspeople
Olympic footballers of Argentina
Pan American Games bronze medalists for Argentina
Medalists at the 1987 Pan American Games
Footballers at the 1987 Pan American Games
Pan American Games medalists in football